Münzbach is a municipality in the district of Perg in the Austrian state of Upper Austria.

Population

References

External links

Cities and towns in Perg District